Achilleos is a surname. Notable people with the surname include:

Chris Achilleos (1947-2021), British painter and illustrator
Georgios Achilleos (born 1980), Cypriot sport shooter
Stelios Achilleos (born 1980), Cypriot footballer

Greek-language surnames